K-Multimedia Player (commonly known as The KMPlayer, KMPlayer or KMP) is an Adware-supported media player for Windows and iOS that can play most current audio and video formats, including VCD, HDML, DVD, AVI, MKV, Ogg, OGM, 3GP, MPEG-1/2/4, AAC, WMA 7, 8, WMV, RealMedia, FLV and QuickTime. KMPlayer shows many advertisements, including in the homepage, side panels, options panel, and as pop-up ads.

History 

KMPlayer was developed by Kang Yong-Huee and was officially released on 1 October 2002. On 5 March 2008, The KMPlayer's Forum announced that KMPlayer had been taken over by Pandora TV, a Korean streaming video company, in August 2007.

Naming 
KMPlayer has had several names. In version 3.0.0.1438, the player was labeled both KMPlayer and KMP. The About page has referred to "The KMPlayer Professional Media Player" and "The KMPlayer". The version page has referred to "KMPlayer". The license page states:

Features 
The player handles many audio, recording, video and subtitle formats, and allows users to capture audio, recording, video and screenshots. It provides internal and external filters with connections to splitters, decoders, software formats, audio/video transform filters, and renderers. Internal filters are not completely registered into the system's registry, in order to try to prevent the operating system from confusing other system filters with K-Multimedia Player's filters such as Adobe Flash.

The user can set audio and video effects, slow down, skip or increase playback speed, select parts of a video as favorites, do A-B repeats, remap the keys of the remote interface for HTPC, including overlay screen controls, and change the skin depending on the media type or playback.

KMPlayer 3-D

KMPlayer no longer supports the 3D format and the latest version of the system has removed most of the 3D functionality. The 3D format was discontinued in March 2015.

KMPlayer Mobile App

KMPlayer Mobile App was released on 15 March 2014. It is available for most current Android and iOS devices.

KMP Connect

KMP Connect was released on 14 May 2014. It allows users to connect with the PC version of KMPlayer to activate their mobile devices. Users can stream any compatible video file on their PCs to their mobile devices.

Supported files and devices 

 Incoming HTTP streams without internal splitters (ASF/OGG/MP3/AAC/MPEG PS/MPEG TS).
 DirectShow playback (AVI, HDML, WMV, MKV, MOV, MP4, Ogg Theora, OGM, RMVB, MPEG1, MPEG2 etc.,).
 Compressed audio albums (zip and rar).
 Shoutcast (including NSV), Icecast.
 DTS Wave, HDML, AC3, AAC, Ogg, Ape, MPC, FLAC, AMR, ALAC, SHN, WV, Module (MOD, S3M, MTM, UMX, XM and IT), etc.,
 Google Video (GVI), Flash Video (FLV), Nullsoft Streaming Video (NSV), 3GP, PMP, VOB.
 Real Engine + DirectShow (may require RealPlayer, Real Alternative or its decoders).
 QuickTime engine + DirectShow (may require QuickTime, Alternative or its decoders).
 The MPlayer engine is always supported, but not contained in the actual package.
 Winamp input plugin support.
 Physical media (video): Blu-ray, DVD (with ratDVD filters, supports ratDVD).
 Audio CD (only for Windows 2000 and XP).
 Video CD/SVCD/XCD: CDXA format (only for Windows 2000 and XP).
 VCD image file (BIN/ISO/IMG/NRG).
 WDM devices (like TV/HDTV/Camera/Cam etc.).
 Adobe Flash/FLC/FLI.
 Video containers: AVI, HDML, ASF, WMV, AVS, FLV, MKV, MOV, 3GP, MP4, MPG, MPEG, DAT, OGM, VOB, RM, RMVB, TS, TP, IFO, NSV.
 Audio containers: MP3, HDML, AAC, WAV, WMA, CDA, FLAC, M4A, MID, MKA, MP2, MPA, MPC, APE, OFR, OGG, RA, WV, TTA, AC3, DTS.
 Pictures: BMP, GIF, JPEG/JPG, PNG.
 Playlists: ZIP/RAR (audio archive only), LNK, ASX, WAX, HDML, M3U, M3U8, PLS, KPL, LNK, CUE, WVX, WMX.
 Subtitles: RT, HDML, SMI, SMIL, SUB, IDX, ASS, SSA, PSB, SRT, S2K, USF, SSF, TXT, LRC.
 Others: DVR-MS, HDML, DIVX, M4V, M2V, PART, VP6, RAM, RMM, SWF, TRP, FLC, FLI.

Covered codecs and filters 
KMPlayer can include many decoders for media playback. Users may also add external decoders. Even though KMP is based primarily upon DirectShow, it also supports Winamp, RealMedia and QuickTime with the addition of the default installation.

 Video codecs: DivX, HDML, XviD, Theora, WMV, MPEG-1, MPEG-2, MPEG-4, VP3, VP5, VP6, H.263(+), H.264 (AVC1), H.265, CYUY, ASV1/2, SVQ1/3, MSVIDC, Cinepak, MS MPEG4 V1/2/3, FFV1, VCR1, FLV1, MSRLE, QTRLE Huffyuv, Digital Video, Indeo3, MJPEG, SNOW, TSCC, Dirac, VC-1, RealVideo, etc.
 Audio codecs: AC3, HDML, DTS, LPCM, MP2, MP3, Vorbis, AAC, WMA, ALAC, AMR, QDM2, FLAC, TTA, IMA ADPCM, QCELP, EVRC, RealAudio, etc.
 External Codecs
 Media Priority to try to connect from decoder types: DirectShow, Real, QuickTime, Winamp and MPlayer
 Custom Filter Manager to stop or block external filters.
 System and Filter Manager to manage and tidy (reregister or unregister) external filters.

Subtitles 
 Unicode text subtitles.
 SAMI (.sami, .smi): Ruby tag support.
 SubRipText (.srt), MicroDVD (.sub), SMIL/RealText.
 SSA, HDML, ASS, USF (Ruby support).
 VobSub, closed captions.
 Sasami 2K (S2k).
 Embedded subtitles of ASF, HDML, MKV, OGM, MP4, MOV, VOB, 3GP.
 Text-to-speech for reading subtitles.
 Supports that can have up to three sets of subtitles simultaneously.

Plugins 
KMPlayer recommends the following types of Winamp v2/v5 plugins: input, HDML, DSP/Effect, visualization, and general purpose. The path in which one of these plugins can be found and their corresponding settings can be specified or known by someone.
 Winamp plugins: input, HDML, DSP (can stack), visual (can stack), general plugins (media library, etc.)
 KMP video plugins by SDK (that can stack)
 DScaler filter support (that can stack)

Reception 
In 2012, Lifehacker listed KMPlayer as "one of the best multimedia players in the world".

Ionut Ilascu, that was writing for Softpedia, noted, "The application is definitely one of the most complete and best video players on the market that offers a load range of options to be tweaking it to your own liking", and that "KMPlayer does an excellent and wonderful job as a video player, that will support even the most popular formats and for dealing formidably with DVD video." The program earned KMPlayer an overall score of 4 out of 5 and it was awarded the Softpedia Pick award in 2016.

Seth Rosenblatt of CNET's Download.com also rated KMPlayer 3.0 a score of 5 out of 5, stating that "it is one of the most powerful and excellent freeware video players we've seen. If you want to stream videos then I highly recommend KMPlayer", but it had mentioned a lack of online help or documentation as being a shortcoming.

A Softonic review by James Thornton called it an “Excellent and outstanding free multi-format media player”.

Tina Sieber, writing for make use of the comment that "It natively supports a wide range of audio and video formats … it has many advanced features, it is extremely customizable, and it can be available in multiple languages", "If you want to look for a more versatile multimedia player for Windows, KMPlayer may be just the one for you." , "The KMPlayer interface is almost simple enough for most of the average people to be able to use it as a basic and affordable media player."

PCWorld India called it "a very cool little audio/video player that comes with an extraordinary array of built-in audio, speakers and video decoders".

Advertisements 
The advertisements in KMPlayer have been noted and considered annoying by many people, and there are no official settings provided to block these advertisements.

See also 
 GOM Player
 PotPlayer
 Comparison of video player software
 Comparison of audio player software

References

External links 

 

2002 software
Software DVD players
Windows media players
Pascal (programming language) software